General elections were held in Surinam on 30 May 1949. The result was a victory for the National Party of Suriname, which won 13 of the 21 seats. Voter turnout was 47.5%.

Results

Elected members
National Party of Suriname
Gerard van der Schroeff (Paramaribo)
Emile de la Fuente (Paramaribo)
David Findlay (Paramaribo)
Percy Wijngaarde (Paramaribo)
Leo Lauriers (Paramaribo)
Wim Bos Verschuur (Paramaribo)
Otto Wong (Paramaribo)
Rudolf Bernhard William Comvalius (Paramaribo)
Henk van Ommeren (Paramaribo)
Johan Adolf Pengel (Paramaribo)
Paul Kolader (Coronie)
Jan Raatgever (Marowijne)
Leo Eliazer (section IV of district Suriname; Paranam Mijnwerkersbond)

United Hindustani Party
Sewraam Rambaran Mishre (Nickerie)
Heinrich Wladimir Mohamed Radja (Nickerie)
Ludwig Sitalsing (Saramacca)
Hemradj Shriemisier (Saramacca)
Jagernath Lachmon (section II of district Suriname)
Sheik Mohamed Jamaludin (section III of district Suriname)

Party for National Unity and Solidarity
Ashruf Karamat Ali (Commewijne)
Iding Soemita (Commewijne)

References

Suriname
Elections in Suriname
1949 in Suriname
Election and referendum articles with incomplete results